Ferrocarriles Unidos del Sureste was a company that operated a railroad in southeastern Mexico.  In the 1930s the Mexican government decided to build a railroad into the Yucatán, connecting the national system with the isolated Ferrocarriles Unidos de Yucatán.  The project was completed in 1950 as the Ferrocarril del Sureste and commemorated with a 5 peso coin.   In 1975 the Yucatán and Southeast systems were merged into the Ferrocarriles Unidos del Sureste.  The system was privatized in 1999, becoming part of Ferrocarriles Chiapas-Mayab (FCCM) until 2007  and since part of Ferrocarril del Istmo de Tehuantepec.

See also
Ferrocarriles Unidos de Yucatán
List of Mexican railroads

References

Unidos del Sureste